Abanga can refer to:
 Abanga River, river in Gabon
 George Abanga (1976-2015), Ghanaian radio journalist
 West Indian term for any of several varieties of palm (plant) or its fruit

See also
 Abhanga, Hindu devotional poetry
 Abang (disambiguation)
 Abangan, type of Javanese Muslim